Bart Edwards is a British actor. Edwards played the role of Jasper Hunt in Lifetime/Hulu drama series Unreal, and starred as Jonathan Kay in NRK drama Lykkeland.
Edwards is set to star in Giles Alderson's thriller The Dare, to be released in 2019, and the ITV’s six-part drama The Singapore Grip, as Captain James Ehrendorf.

Education 
Edwards attended Tring Park School for the Performing Arts and then studied acting at the Bristol Old Vic Theatre School.

Career 
Edwards started his career in the U.K. starring as Joe on Channel 4’s Peep Show and as Olly Greenwood on BBC’s EastEnders. He also appeared in Stan Lee’s Lucky Man, Netflix/Channel 4’s Fresh Meat, ITV’s Leaving, and Carnival Film’s Call the Midwife for PBS/BBC.
He played roles in Warner Bros’ Fantastic Beasts and Where To Find Them, The Weinstein Company’s The Man with the Iron Heart, and two indie short films directed by Mark Lobatto: Silent Treatment, and Blue Borsalino.
Edwards starred on season three of Lifetime’s drama series Unreal in the role of Jasper, alongside Constance Zimmer and Shiri Appleby.
In 2019, he starred the Norwegian series Lykkeland (also known as State of Happiness), premiered at the 1st Cannes International Series Festival winning two awards.
Also in 2019, he is set to star in Millennium Film’s horror movie The Dare.

Edwards was cast in The Singapore Grip, where he will portray Captain James Ehrendorf. In 2019, Edwards appeared as Urcheon of Erlenwald / Duny / Emperor Emhyr var Emreis in the first and second seasons of The Witcher.

Filmography

Televison

References

External links 
 

20th-century British male actors
21st-century British male actors
Living people
Year of birth missing (living people)